Rathnayake Mudiyanselage Kumarasiri Rathnayake (born 15 January 1967) is a Sri Lankan teacher, politician, former provincial minister and Member of Parliament.

Rathnayake was born on 15 January 1967. He has a BSc degree from the University of Ruhuna. He is a teacher.

Rathnayake was a member of Monaragala Divisional Council and Uva Provincial Council where he held a provincial ministerial portfolio for two terms. He contested the 2020 parliamentary election as a Sri Lanka People's Freedom Alliance electoral alliance candidate in Monaragala District and was elected to the Parliament of Sri Lanka.

References

1967 births
Alumni of the University of Ruhuna
Local authority councillors of Sri Lanka
Living people
Members of the 16th Parliament of Sri Lanka
Members of the Uva Province Board of Ministers
Sinhalese politicians
Sinhalese teachers
Sri Lankan Buddhists
Sri Lanka People's Freedom Alliance politicians
Sri Lanka Podujana Peramuna politicians
United People's Freedom Alliance politicians